Ingmāra Balode (born 1981 in Auce, Latvia), is a Latvian poet and translator.

Biography 
A graduate of the Riga School of Applied Arts (Rīgas Lietišķās mākslas koledža), she holds a bachelor's and master's degree from the Latvian Academy of Culture, where she is currently working on her PhD. From 2006 to 2011 she worked as an editor for the cultural portal 1/4 Satori and since 2012 for the publishing house Mansards.

Selected works

Poetry
 Ledenes, ar kurām var sagriezt mēli (2007)
 alba (2012)

References

1981 births
Living people
21st-century Latvian poets
Latvian translators
Latvian women poets
21st-century Latvian women writers
21st-century translators
People from Auce